The 1905 Stanford football team represented Stanford University in the 1905 college football season. In head coach James F. Lanagan's third season, Stanford went undefeated.  The team played their home games at Stanford Field in Stanford, California.

The 1905 season marked the first meeting between Stanford and USC.  Consequently, Stanford is USC's oldest existing rival.

The Big Game between Stanford and Cal on November 11, 1905, was the first played at Stanford Field, with Stanford winning 12–5.

Following the 1905 season, Stanford, responding like other American universities to concerns about the violence in football, dropped football in favor of rugby. Despite having no knowledge of the sport, Lanagan was retained as the rugby coach, spending time in Vancouver, British Columbia, to study the sport, and coached for three seasons. He also served as Stanford's baseball coach from 1906 to 1907.

Stanford would not play varsity football again until the 1919 season.

Schedule

References

Stanford
Stanford Cardinal football seasons
College football undefeated seasons
Stanford football